Penestae may refer to:
Penestai (or penestae), a class of unfree labourers in Thessaly, Ancient Greece
Penestae (tribe), an Illyrian tribe that lived in south-eastern Illyria